Lista monticola is a species of moth of the family Pyralidae. It was described by H. Yamanaka in 2000 and is known from Nepal (it was described from Godavari, Bagmati).

References

Moths described in 2000
Epipaschiinae